Austin Stoker (October 7, 1930 – October 7, 2022) was a Trinidadian-American actor known for his role as Lt. Ethan Bishop, the police officer in charge of the besieged Precinct 9, Division 13, in John Carpenter's Howard Hawks-inspired 1976 film, Assault on Precinct 13. This was one of the few heroic starring roles for a black actor in an action film of the 1970s outside of the blaxploitation genre.

Stoker was born in Port of Spain, Trinidad and Tobago on October 7, 1930. He started his career on stage, including the 1954 Broadway production of Truman Capote's House of Flowers, where he met his future wife, Enid Mosier (acting name Vivian Bonnell). Prior to his role as Lt. Bishop, Stoker appeared in several blaxploitation films, often playing police detectives.  Among these films were Abby (1974), Combat Cops (1974), and Sheba, Baby (1975), in which he played Pam Grier's love interest. Some of Stoker's other notable acting roles were in Battle for the Planet of the Apes (1973), Horror High (1974), Airport 1975 (1974), Victory at Entebbe (1976), and the 1977 television mini-series Roots.

Stoker is known to Mystery Science Theater 3000 fans for his role as Dr. Ken Melrose in the 1982 B-movie, Time Walker, in which he appeared with Darwin Joston, his co-star from Assault on Precinct 13.

Stoker died of renal failure at the Cedars-Sinai Medical Center in Los Angeles, California, on October 7, 2022, his 92nd birthday.

Filmography
Battle for the Planet of the Apes (1973) as Bruce MacDonald
Horror High (1974) as Lieutenant Bozeman
The Get-Man (1974) as LT. Frank Savage
Airport 1975 (1974) as Air Force Sgt.
Abby (1974) as Det. Cass Potter
Sheba, Baby (1975) as Brick Williams
Assault on Precinct 13 (1976) as Lt. Ethan Bishop
Victory at Entebbe (1976, TV Movie) as Dr. Ghota
Time Walker (1982) as Dr. Ken Melrose
A Girl to Kill For (1990) as Guard Number One
Two Shades of Blue (1999) as Security Guard
Mach 2 (2000) as Edwards
Between the Lines (2006) as Charles
Machete Joe (2010) as Raymond Sinclair
Give Til It Hurts (2015) as Reverend Bishop
Descention (2016) as Brother Malcolm (rumored)
Surge of Power: Revenge of the Sequel (2016) as Himself
Shhhh (2017) as Dave
3 from Hell (2019) as Earl Gibson
Double Down (2020) as Vincent Jamison II 
''Give Till It Hurts (2022) as Reverend Bishop

References

External links

1930 births
2022 deaths
American male film actors
People from Port of Spain
Trinidad and Tobago emigrants to the United States
Trinidad and Tobago male television actors
Trinidad and Tobago male film actors
African-American male actors
American male television actors
20th-century Trinidad and Tobago male actors
21st-century African-American people
20th-century African-American people
20th-century Trinidad and Tobago actors